Willie Kavanaugh Hocker (July 21, 1862 – February 6, 1944) was an American schoolteacher and designer of the Arkansas state flag.

Biography
Willie Kavanaugh Hocker was born in Madison County, Kentucky. Her father was a farmer. She and her family moved to Arkansas in 1870. After obtaining a teaching certificate in 1887, she taught school at Wabbaseka, Arkansas. Hocker died at her home in Jefferson County on February 6, 1944, at the age of 81.

Flag of Arkansas

Hocker was a member of the Pine Bluff chapter of the Daughters of the American Revolution. Her chapter wanted to present the newly commissioned  with a state flag; however the chapter was informed that a state flag did not exist at all. Hocker, along with other citizens, sent flag designs to Earle W. Hodges, who was the Secretary of State.  She proposed a red flag with a white diamond surrounded by a border of blue, 25 white stars in the blue and three blue stars inside the white diamond. The flag design committee suggested adding the name "Arkansas" to the flag. Hocker agreed; thus the first design of the state flag was born. After some changes to add a fourth blue star to the flag, to represent Arkansas's membership in the Confederate States, the final design was set in 1924.

See also
List of people from Kentucky

External links

 
 Willie Kavanaugh Hocker at the Encyclopedia of Arkansas

1862 births
1944 deaths
19th-century American educators
19th-century American poets
19th-century Methodists
20th-century American educators
20th-century American poets
20th-century Methodists
Schoolteachers from Arkansas
Burials in Jefferson County, Arkansas
Daughters of the American Revolution people
Flag designers
Members of the United Daughters of the Confederacy
Methodists from Arkansas
National Society of the Colonial Dames of America
People from Jefferson County, Arkansas
People from Madison County, Kentucky
Poets from Kentucky